Abel's sister is an ATV series.

Cast and characters
 Davit Grigoryan portrays Abel Grigoryan
 Narine Dovlatyan portrays Lilith Grigoryan
 Hakob Hakobyan portrays Sevak
 Hayk Sargsyan portrays Hakob
 Hovak Galoyan portrays Kamo
 Aramo portrays Aramo
 Hovak Galoyan portrays Avag Grigoryan
 Yulia Fink portrays Alina Grigoryan
 Karo Hovhannisyan portrays Aram Grigoryan
 Araqsya Meliqyan portrays Ester
 Meri Hakobyan portrays Lika Grigoryan
 Elen Asatryan portrays Nonna 
 Mika Ghaplanyan portrays Arman
 Artur Manucharyan portrays David
 Kristine Karapetyan portrays Astghik
 Artur Harutyunyan portrays inspector
 Lilit Abelyan portrays Sara
 Yura Igitkhanyan portrays Abraham Semionich
 Lili Vardanyan portrays Mrs Manoukyan
 Emma Zournachyan portrays Mariam
 Yelena Borisenko portrays Silva
 Davit Mardyan portrays Noi

References

External links
 
  
 Abel's Sister on Armserial
 Abel's Sister on ArmFilm
 Abel's sister  on Merkino

Armenian drama television series
Armenian-language television shows
ATV (Armenia) original programming
2016 Armenian television series debuts
2010s Armenian television series
2016 Armenian television series endings
2010s drama television series